The African Journal of Traditional, Complementary and Alternative Medicines is a peer-reviewed open access medical journal covering research on medicinal plants, traditional medicine, complementary alternative medicine, and food and agricultural technologies. It is included on Jeffrey Beall's list of "Potential, possible, or probable predatory scholarly open-access journals".

Abstracting and indexing
The journal is abstracted and indexed in:
Current Contents - Clinical Medicine
Index Medicus/MEDLINE/PubMed
Science Citation Index Expanded
Scopus
According to the Journal Citation Reports, the journal has a 2015 impact factor of 0.506.

See also
Predatory open access publishing

References

External links 
 
 African Journal of Traditional, Complementary and Alternative Medicines at African Journals OnLine

Health in Africa
Publications established in 2004
Alternative and traditional medicine journals
Quarterly journals
Creative Commons Attribution-licensed journals
English-language journals